Buford is an unincorporated ghost town in Albany County, Wyoming, United States. It is located between Laramie and Cheyenne on Interstate 80. Its last resident, who had been the lone resident for nearly two decades, left in 2012.

Location
Buford is located in the Laramie Mountains, between the towns of Laramie and Cheyenne. The town is along the eastern approach to Sherman Hill Summit, the highest point along all of the transcontinental Interstate 80, Lincoln Highway and the Overland Route. Buford is also an access to reach the Ames Monument, which marks the highest point along the original routing of the First transcontinental railroad.

History
The original town was founded in 1866.  A Chicago Tribune article from 2012 stated that the locale began as a military outpost during the construction of the Transcontinental Railroad, but shrank when the fort moved to Laramie. The town once boasted a population of 2,000.

The Buford post office was established in August 1900, originally attributed as being in Laramie County but attributed to Albany County beginning in 1901.  The post office suspended service on February 1, 1999, and the post office itself was discontinued on July 24, 2004, with mail service given to the post office at Cheyenne.  There was a school operating in Buford from 1905 to 1962.
The railroad sold the Buford site to a private buyer in 1970.

Don Sammons, with Sammons' wife and son, moved to Buford from California  in 1980. Sammons was the officer-in-charge of the post office beginning in 1993, and postmaster from April 1994 until the post office closed. Around 1995, Sammons' wife died, and around 2008, his son moved away. When Sammons decided to move to be closer to his adult son, he auctioned off the site in April 2012.

The town was put up for auction on April 5, 2012, with the highest bid of $900,000 having been made by two then-unidentified Vietnamese men. Later, it was revealed that one of them was Phạm Đình Nguyên.  The new owners sold "PhinDeli" brand coffee, imported from Vietnam, in the convenience store.  In 2013, the new Vietnamese owner re-branded the site as "PhinDeli Town Buford".  Nguyen never lived in the town and only visited it occasionally.  Sammons managed the store for months and then Albany County native Jason Hirsh took over management while his son and nephew maintained the property and lived on site. In September 2017, Hirsh resigned and the store was boarded up.

See also
Fort Sanders (Wyoming) — sometimes associated with Buford
Monowi, Nebraska – The only incorporated village with only 1 person

References

External links
 Buford Wyoming: Dan Sammons, Author Buford One — official site of Buford owner in 1990s and 2000s, including information about a book Sammons wrote about Buford
 2010 video interview from CNN
 NPR profile 2017

Unincorporated communities in Albany County, Wyoming
Unincorporated communities in Wyoming